Nybro Idrottsförening (Nybro Athletic Association) is a Swedish association football club located in Nybro.

Background
Nybro IF was founded in 1906 and has played in Sweden's second-highest division in football and men's top division in men's ice hockey. The ice hockey section broke away from the club in 1998 and formed their own club, Nybro Vikings IF.

Since their foundation Nybro IF has participated mainly in the upper and middle divisions of the Swedish football league system.  The club currently plays in Division 3 Sydöstra Götaland which is the fifth tier of Swedish football. They play their home matches at the Victoriavallen in Nybro.

Players who have turned out in the colours of Nybro IF include Joel Allansson (now IFK Gothenburg), Christoffer Andersson (Helsingborgs IF), Peter Abelsson (Trelleborg FF), David Elm (Fulham FC) and Viktor Elm (Heerenveen).

Nybro IF are affiliated to the Smålands Fotbollförbund.

Season to season

Footnotes

External links
 Nybro IF – Official website

{

Sport in Kalmar County
Football clubs in Kalmar County
Association football clubs established in 1906
1906 establishments in Sweden